Matthias Rexroth (b. Nürnberg, Germany, 7 January 1970) is a German countertenor and voice teacher. Winning 1st prizes at the Francisco-Viñas in Barcelona  and the 'Belvedere Competition' in Vienna in 2000, preceded an extensive international performing and teaching career.

Early life and education 

Matthias Rexroth was raised in Coburg and completed studies as an oboist, playing professionally before discovering his countertenor voice. He usually refers to himself as an Altus (In English, a "Male alto").

Rexroth studied at the Musikhochschule Karlsruhe, the Schola Cantorum Basiliensis, and privately with Marilyn Horne. In 1999 he received a stipend award from the cultural foundation of the state of Baden Württemberg.

Voice Teacher 
Rexroth is a professor of voice at the Warsaw Opera Academy of the national theater Teater Wielki and gives masterclasses at the Berlin Hans Eisler Musikhochschule, the Meistersingerakademie in Neumarkt, Frankfurt Opera, Kyoto City University of Arts, Duszniki Zdroj, Daegu, Novosibirsk and the Kaunas Music Academy as well as masterclasses for ENOA.

Career
Rexroth was hired by Pamela Rosenberg for his debut at the Staatsoper Stuttgart with Purcell's King Arthur in 1999. A year later, in 2000, followed Apollo in Legrenzi's opera  La divisione del mondo  at the Schwetzingen Festival with Thomas Hengelbrock. His first major concert appearance was the internationally televised Bach-year 2000, Bach's Mass in B minor from the Leipzig Thomaskirche with Thomaskantor Georg Christoph Biller, the Thomanerchor and the Gewandhaus Orchestra.

Also in 2000, Rexroth won two competitions, both wins as first countertenor ever: the 37th Francisco-Viñas in Barcelona - first prize in the category Male voices, as well as ‘best counter-tenor’ and the 19th  'Hans Gabor Belvedere Singing Competition' in Vienna, winning the first prize and eight additional prizes.

In 2001 the Cologne Philharmonie nominated Matthias Rexroth for the "Rising Star" award, with a tour of major European concert houses. In 2003 he represented Germany in the BBC Cardiff Singer of the World competition.

Matthias Rexroth has collaborated frequently with the conductor Nikolaus Harnoncourt in roles such as Unulfo in Handel's Rodelinda at the Theater an der Wien, Hamor in Handel’s Jephtha, Didymus in Handel’s Theodora and Purcell’s Ode to St. Cecilia at the Vienna’s Musikverein and the Styriarte festival in Graz. Notable concerts include those with the Vienna Philharmonic under Riccardo Muti, Fabio Luisi with the Accademia di Santa Cecilia Rome, and Danish National Symphony Orchestra, Nicola Luisotti and Donato Renzetti with the Orchestra del Teatro di San Carlo in Naples and Rafael Frühbeck de Burgos with the Wiener Symphoniker, the ORF Radiosymphonieorchester and Vladimir Fedoseyev. Rexroth performs recitals regularly, at the Berlin Philharmonie, Prinzregententheater in Munich, Bad Kissingen, and with pianists Semion Skigin, Matteo Pais, Mariusz Kłubczuk and Eytan Pessen.

Matthias Rexroth has also been a judge for the 10th Stanislaw Moniuszko competition. His performance of Admeto was nominated for the category best singer performance of Der Faust 2007. He has conducted the Georgisches Kammerorchester and the "Ensemble del' Arte" in Ingolstadt. In 2010 Rexroth appeared in a book of cooking recipes by famous opera singers Die Oper kocht by Evelyn Rillé and Johannes Ifkovits.

Opera
Rexroth sang the title roles in Handel's Giulio Cesare (directed by Stefan Herheim) at the Norwegian National Opera and Ballet in Oslo in 2005, Gluck's Ezio with the Deutsche Oper am Rhein in Düsseldorf in 2007, and Handel's Admeto<ref>Brooke Bryant, "Admeto re di Tessaglia by George Frideric Handel; Howard Arman; Matthias Rexroth; Romelia Lichtenstein; Mechthild Bach; Tim Mead; Raimund Nolte", Notes, Second Series, vol. 66, No. 3 (March, 2010), Music Library Association, pp. 621-622</ref> at the Handel Festival, Halle. For his performance of Admeto, Rexroth was nominated "Best Singing Actor" for the 2007 German theatre prize Der Faust. He performed the title role of Handel's Ottone in Halle in 2011. Other Handel roles include Athamas in Semele in Essen, Arcane in Teseo in Opern- und Schauspielhaus Frankfurt and Staatsoper Stuttgart,  Armindo in Partenope (under Christophe Rousset) and Tolomeo in Giulio Cesare in Frankfurt (2013-5).Claus Ambrosius, Opernwelt, February 2013

Apart from Handel repertoire, Matthias Rexroth performed Corindo in Antonio Cesti's Orontea under Ivor Bolton (2014) at the Frankfurt opera, Nibbio in Giambattista Martini's L'impresario delle Isole Canarie at the Semperoper Dresden (2014) (where he also performed various roles in Purcell's King Arthur -2014), Telemann's Der geduldige Socrates with René Jacobs at the Festwochen der Alten Musik in Innsbruck and at the Staatsoper Berlin, Ottone in Monteverdi's Poppea at Hamburg State Opera, Oberon in Britten's Midsummer Night's Dream at the Staatstheater Darmstadt. Ozia in Almeida's La Giuditta in Frankfurt, Musico in Donizetti's Le convenienze ed inconvenienze teatrali at the Staatsoper Stuttgart, and Strauss’ Die Fledermaus in the Aalto Theatre in Essen under Stefan Soltesz, and Alfonso in Francesco Cavalli's Veremonda.

Concerts
Concert appearances with the Vienna Philharmonic, Gewandhausorchester Leipzig, St. Petersburg Philharmonic, Radio Televisione Española Madrid, Staatsorchester Stuttgart, Santa Cecilia orchestra, Akademie für Alte Musik Berlin, Freiburg Baroque Orchestra, Concerto Köln, Internationale Bachakademie Stuttgart, the Berliner Philharmoniker Scharoun Ensemble Orchestra Montis realis, and the festivals of Schwetzingen, Innsbruck, Ludwigsburg, Rheingau, Baden-Baden and Shanghai.

The composer Wolfgang Rihm wrote Kolonos (“Oedipus auf Kolonos”) for Rexroth, performed and recorded by the SWR and the Rossini in Wildbad opera festival in 2008, and with Constantin Trinks in Darmstadt.Online review on echo-online.de

Recordings
Recordings with all major broadcasting companies in Germany have taken place.  These include: Bayerischer Rundfunk, Mitteldeutscher Rundfunk, Hessischer Rundfunk, Norddeutscher Rundfunk, SFB, Südwestrundfunk, ORF and Deutsche Welle.

Specific recordings
 2001: J.S. Bach  Mass in B minor, Universal Music Classics & Jazz ASIN: B003TXPUN2
 2004: Rossini Tancredi, Nef ASIN: B0002CPFCE  
 2004: Solo recital: Stimme der Könige, Matthias Rexroth NEF ASIN: B0001TSYZS
 2007: Händel, Admeto, Arthaus ASIN: B000M2EBTC
 2007: Gluck's Ezio 2008: CPE Bach Magnificat / Die Himmel erzählen die Ehre Gottes, ASIN: B001GHD43G
 2011: Telemann Germanicus, CPO, ASIN: B005UU066S
 2012: Handel Teseo, Carus, 2012, ASIN: B002QEIQVI
 2012: Mozart Ascanio in Alba, K. 111 (Excerpts) Ars Produktion ASIN: B008Y1VLGE

 Interviews 
 Heinrich Becker, "Matthias Rexroth Temperament für die Bühne", Orpheus, March–April 2003, pp. 10–11  (In German)
 Live interview on NDR (In German)
 2008 interview retrieved June 2013.  (In German)

 References 

Notes

Additional sources
 Beeks, Graydon, Rexroth's performance in Admeto in the  "Report from Halle 2006" in Newsletter of The American Handel Society, Volume XXI, Number 2, Summer 2006
 Kay, Graeme  "This evening, the German singer Matthias Rexroth made history by being the first counter-tenor to take part in the competition", 23 June 2003, on bbc.co.uk. Retrieved 27 June 2003
 Rillé, Evelyn and Johannes Ifkovits, Die Oper kocht (The Opera Cooks)'', Opera Rifko (2010)

External links
 
 Biography on the Semperoper Dresden website retrieved July 2013

Operatic countertenors
Living people
German performers of early music
Schola Cantorum Basiliensis alumni
1970 births
Hochschule für Musik Karlsruhe alumni
German countertenors
21st-century German male opera singers